The Croatian Mint, formerly known as the Croatian Monetary Institute is a state-owned enterprise, that produces circulating coinage for Croatia to conduct its trade and commerce, as well as 
gold and silver medals, commemorative medallions and badges in different metals, and license plates. It does not produce paper money. 

The Institute was founded in Sveta Nedelja on 23 April 1993, and began production on 14 January 1994. On 2 January 2021, the mint announced that its new name would be the Croatian Mint. 

On 18 July 2022, the Croatian Mint began producing euro coins with Croatian national motifs.

References

Manufacturing companies of Croatia
Government-owned companies of Croatia
Mint
Mints (currency)
Mints of Europe